Hydes is an unincorporated community in Baltimore County, Maryland, United States. It is located in the Long Green Valley. The USPS has assigned Hydes the postal code 21082. Saint John the Evangelist church is located in Hydes and is the oldest Roman Catholic Church in Baltimore County. Until 1958, this community was served by the Maryland and Pennsylvania Railroad at milepost 16.8. It is also home to several wineries, including Boordy and Dejon Vineyards.

Hydes is named for Samuel N. Hyde, an agronomist who developed a strain known as "Egyptian" sweet corn, canned by the F.B. Jenkins canning operation of Hydes.

References

Unincorporated communities in Baltimore County, Maryland
Unincorporated communities in Maryland